is a zoological park in Fukuyama, Hiroshima, Japan.

Overview
Fukuyama City Zoo has opened on April 1, 1978, in Ashida-cho, Fukuyama, Hiroshima in Japan.

There are lion-tailed macaques, squirrel monkeys, ring-tailed lemurs, lions, leopards, coyotes, ostriches, Hartman's mountain zebras, reticulated giraffes, southern cassowaries and emus.

Hours
From 9:00 a.m. to 4:30 p.m.

Holidays
Every Tuesday

See also
Japanese Association of Zoos and Aquariums

External links
Fukuyama City Zoo
Japanese Association of Zoos and Aquariums

Parks in Japan
Parks and gardens in Hiroshima Prefecture
Fukuyama, Hiroshima
Zoos in Japan
Zoos established in 1978
1978 establishments in Japan